Bonagratia may refer to:
Bonagratia of Bergamo (c. 1265–1340), Franciscan involved in the "poverty of Christ" controversy
Bonagratia de San Giovanni in Persiceto (fl. 1278–1283), Italian Friar Minor, who became Minister General of the Order